Leshchanoye is a rural locality (a selo) in Vorobyovskoye Rural Settlement, Vorobyovsky District, Voronezh Oblast, Russia. The population was 1,176 as of 2010. There are 13 streets.

Geography 
Leshchanoye is located 12 km south of Vorobyovka (the district's administrative centre) by road. Vorobyovka is the nearest rural locality.

References 

Rural localities in Vorobyovsky District